The Cayuga is an American breed of domestic duck. It was introduced to the Finger Lakes region of New York State in about 1840, and is named for the Cayuga people of that area. Until the last years of the nineteenth century it was the principal duck reared for meat in the United States. In the twenty-first century it is kept mainly for ornament.

History 

The origins of the Cayuga are obscure. A much-repeated theory that it descends not from the mallard like almost all domestic ducks, but from Anas rubripes, the American black duck, remains unsubstantiated and unverified by any scientific evidence. Unlike Anas rubripes, the Cayuga is a true black in color; this color is the result of a genetic mutation fairly common in breeds derived from Anas platyrhynchos.  The Cayuga has other characteristics compatible with derivation from the Mallard; in particular, it shows the typical curled "drake feather" in the tail, while Anas rubripes does not.

In about 1840, one John S. Clark obtained some ducks of this type in Orange County, New York, and took them to Cayuga County in the Finger Lakes region of New York State. The breed is named for the indigenous Cayuga people of the area.

The Cayuga was included in the first edition of the American Standard of Perfection in 1874. It was first exported to the United Kingdom in 1851; the first British standard was published in 1901. In the second half of the nineteenth century it became the principal duck breed reared for meat in the United States, but from about 1890 was rapidly displaced by the American Pekin.

Its conservation status world-wide was listed by the FAO in 2007 as "not at risk". In 2008 its status in the United States was listed as "threatened" by the American Livestock Breeds Conservancy (now The Livestock Conservancy); in 2020 it was listed as "watch".

Characteristics 

The plumage is black with iridescent beetle-green lights; particularly in ducks, some feathers may fade or whiten as the bird ages, which can be a disqualifying fault for showing. The bill, legs and feet are black or as nearly so as possible; the eyes are dark brown.

Use 

The Cayuga is a meat-type duck. In the second half of the nineteenth century it became the principal duck breed reared for meat in the United States. From about 1890 it began to be displaced by the American Pekin, which did not have the black pinfeathers of the Cayuga and so was easier to pluck and clean for sale.

In the twenty-first century it may be reared for meat and eggs, but is most often kept for ornament or for showing. Ducks may lay some 100–150 large eggs per year. At the beginning of the laying season the eggs are dark and may be almost black; they gradually lighten to the usual pale greenish blue or almost to white by the end of the season. If they are to be hatched, the incubation time for the eggs is 28 days.

The feathers may be used in the tying of fishing flies.

References

Duck breeds
Duck breeds originating in the United States
Conservation Priority Breeds of the Livestock Conservancy
Animal breeds on the RBST Watchlist

pt:Pato#Híbridos